Stanislaus Hosius (5 May 1504 – 5 August 1579) was a Polish Roman Catholic cardinal. From 1551 he was the Prince-Bishop of the Bishopric of Warmia in Royal Prussia and from 1558 he served as the papal legate to the Holy Roman Emperor's Imperial Court in Vienna, Austria. From 1566 he was also the papal legate to Poland.

He is designated a Servant of God.

Early life
Hosius was born in Kraków, the son of Ulrich Hosse of Pforzheim. He spent his early youth at Kraków and Vilnius, and at the age of fifteen, already well versed in German, Polish and Latin, he entered the University of Kraków from which he graduated as Bachelor of Arts in 1520. Piotr Tomicki, Bishop of Kraków and Vice-Chancellor of Poland, employed him as private secretary and entrusted to him the education of his nephews. Tomicki became his patron and underwrote his studies at the University of Padua and the University of Bologna, Italy. At Padua, Reginald Pole was one of his fellow students. At Bologna, he pursued jurisprudence under Hugo Buoncompagni, the future Gregory XIII.

Career
After graduating as doctor of canon and civil law at the University of Bologna on 8 June 1534, he returned to Cracow and became secretary in the royal chancery. On the death of Bishop Tomicki (1535), he continued as secretary under the new vice-chancellor, Bishop Jan Chojeński of Płock. After the death of Bishop Choinski in 1538, Hosius was appointed royal secretary. In that position, he had the entire confidence of King Sigismund, who bestowed various ecclesiastical benefices upon him as reward for his faithful services. In 1543, Hosius was ordained priest. King Sigismund died in 1548, but before his death, he had instructed his son and successor, Sigismund II, to nominate Hosius for the next vacant episcopal see.

Hosius was nominated for the See of Chełmno in 1549. He had not sought that dignity and accepted it only with reluctance. Hosius was then sent by Sigismund on a diplomatic important mission to the courts of King Ferdinand I at Prague and Emperor Charles V at Brussels and Ghent. The mission resulted in an alliance between Poland and the other monarchies. Upon his return to Poland, he received episcopal consecration at Kraków on 23 March 1550, and he immediately took possession of his see. Hosius had Jesuit sympathies and actively opposed the Protestant Reformation.

Two years later, he became Prince-Bishop of Warmia in Royal Prussia, Poland. Hosius drew up the Confessio fidei christiana catholica, adopted by the Synod of Piotrków in 1557. He was a supremely-skillful diplomat and administrator. Hosius and Marcin Kromer were the two bishops most instrumental in keeping the Warmia region Catholic, and neighbouring Ducal Prussia became Protestant. In 1558 Pope Paul IV summoned him to Rome, and soon Hosius became an influential member of the Roman Curia.

The following year, Pope Pius IV appointed Hosius as his personal nuncio to Ferdinand I, Holy Roman Emperor, at the court in Vienna, where he was to work on the reopening of the Council of Trent. He was further charged with gaining the support of the emperor's son, Maximilian, who appeared to have Protestant sympathies. For his successful work Hosius was promoted to cardinal in 1561. Pope Pius IV named him Legate-Theologian for the third session of the Council of Trent; the other two legates were Cardinals Puteo and Gonzaga.

Despite health issues he mediated between the various factions at the Council and addressed issues particular to Poland-Lithuania, such as the status of the Teutonic Knights and the marriage of Stanislaus Orzechowski. When the Council ended, he returned home, despite requests to travel to Rome for the papal conclave that was to be held after the death of the ailing Pius IV. Cardinal Truchess even suggested thag Hosius was a candidate for the papacy. Instead of going to Rome, he returned to his diocese, leaving Trent on December 1563 to implement the decrees and canons of the Council of Trent. In 1566, Pope Pius V consecrated him as Papal Legate to Poland.

Death and legacy
Besides carrying through many difficult negotiations, he founded the lyceum of Braunsberg to counter the rapidly spreading Protestants. It became the centre of the Roman Catholic mission among Protestants. In 1572, Pope Gregory XIII declared Hosius a member of the Congregatio Germania. He died at Capranica Prenestina, near Rome, on 5 August 1579.

A special friend to Hosius was Saint Peter Canisius. Both Kromer and Hosius left many records of their German speeches and sermons in their years of duty in the Bishopric of Warmia. They were later translated to Czech, English, and French.

A collected edition of his works was published at Cologne, Germany in 1584 ( Life by A Eichhorn (Mainz, Germany, 1854), 2 vols).

Cause of beatification
The cause of sainthood commenced but paused for a while until it resumed as of 5 August 2006. He is now known as a Servant of God.

Literature 
 
 
 Theologische Realenzyklopädie (TRE), Bd. 15, S. 598-600
 Benrath: Realenzyklopädie für protestantische Theologie und Kirche (RE) 3. Auflage Bd. 8 S. 382-392
 Heinz Scheible: Melanchthons Briefwechsel Personen 12 Stuttgart-Bad Cannstatt, Germany, 2005 
 Lexikon für Theologie und Kirche (LThK) 3. Auflage Bd. 5 S. 284
 Arno Sames: Religion in Geschichte und Gegenwart (RGG) 4 Auflage, Bd. 3, S. 1912
 Stanislao Rescio (Reszka), "D. Stanislai Hosii Vita," Acta Historica Res Gestas Poloniae illustrantia Tomus IV (ed. F. Hipler and V. Zakrzewski) (Cracow 1879), I-CXXIV.

References

Sources
 Wojtyska, Henryk Damian. Cardinal Hosius Legate to the Council of Trent Studia Ecclesiastica, 3 Historica, 4 Dissertationes, 5. Rome,: Institute of ecclesiastical studies, 1967.
 
 
 
 Stanislai Hosii (...) Opera omnia in duos divisa tomos, quorum primus ab (...) auctore (...) auctus et recognitus (...) secundus autem totus novus, nuncque primum typis excusus (...)
 Stanislai Hosii (...) Opera omnia (...) nunc novissime ab ipso auctore (...) recognita (...) cura (...) Henrici Dunghaei (...) edita (...)
 Ersch / Gruber: Allgemeine Encyclopädie der Wissenschaften und Künste VOLUME Sect. 2 T. 11 S. 93
 
Four cities of Germany

External links
 Works by Stanislaus Hosius in digital library Polona

Ecclesiastical senators of the Polish–Lithuanian Commonwealth
1504 births
1579 deaths
16th-century Latin-language writers
16th-century Roman Catholic bishops in the Polish–Lithuanian Commonwealth
Bishops of Warmia
Clergy from Kraków
People from Royal Prussia
16th-century Polish cardinals
Diplomats of the Polish–Lithuanian Commonwealth
Ambassadors of Poland to Austria
University of Padua alumni
University of Bologna alumni
Major Penitentiaries of the Apostolic Penitentiary
Participants in the Council of Trent
Apostolic Nuncios to Poland
Polish Servants of God
16th-century venerated Christians
Polish people of German descent